The Bride is the fourth studio album by English singer-songwriter Natasha Khan, professionally known as Bat for Lashes. It was released on 1 July 2016 by Parlophone. The album was produced by Khan, with co-production from Ben Christophers, Simone Felice, David Baron, Dan Carey, Jacknife Lee and Matt "Aqualung" Hales. The Bride was preceded by the digital promotional single "I Do", followed by the singles "In God's House", "Sunday Love", "Joe's Dream", and the double A-side release of "If I Knew" and "In Your Bed".

Background
While promoting her side project Sexwitch, which she formed with Dan Carey and the indie rock band Toy, Khan stated that she was working on a new album. She stated that it was linked to a short film she had made about a woman going through a tragedy on her wedding day and that the album would be hopefully released in spring of 2016. In February 2016, Khan started posting preview photos from her collaboration with photographer Neil Krug. On 19 February 2016, she released a promotional single titled "I Do" with cryptic artwork stating "Save the Date, 1st July 2016". The lead single from the album, "In God's House", debuted on Annie Mac's BBC Radio 1 show on 10 March, and was released digitally the following day.

Concept, release and artwork
According to The Brides press release, the work is a concept album that follows the story of a woman, whose fiancé dies in a car crash on the way to their wedding. The album follows her as she decides to go on the honeymoon alone and her emotions as she deals with the tragedy. Khan commented that "the trauma and the grief from the death of Joe, the groom, ... [is] ... more of a metaphor and it allows me to explore the concept of love in general, which requires a death of sorts."

The album was created with past collaborators Simone Felice, Dan Carey, Head and Ben Christophers. The release of the album was preceded by the singles "In God's House" and "Sunday Love", both with music videos directed by Khan herself and John DeMenil. To promote the album, Bat for Lashes embarked on a small tour which consisted of performing in a number of churches to match the wedding theme. Fans and attendees were asked to wear formal attire to the shows. The album's artwork was made in collaboration with photographer Neil Krug and was shot over the course of a year. The CD and vinyl feature a booklet and prints of the photos from this collaboration.

Critical reception

The Bride received generally positive reviews from music critics. At Metacritic, which assigns a normalised rating out of 100 to reviews from mainstream publications, the album received an average score of 78, based on 30 reviews. Neil McCormick of The Daily Telegraph hailed The Bride as "a beautiful, beguiling, disturbing and rewarding album of love, loss, grief and recovery from one of the most intriguing singer-songwriters currently active in British music, of either gender." Rachel Aroesti of The Guardian described the album as "a collection of darkly intriguing dirges, a battle for dominance between Khan's intimate, exquisitely beautiful vocal and subtly unnerving sonic dissonance at its heart." Larry Bartleet of NME viewed the album as Khan's "most ambitious yet" and remarked that she "refuses to yield crossover hits like 2009's 'Daniel' [...] opting instead for a slow style of storytelling that rewards the patient listener." George Garner of Q dubbed it Khan's "boldest album yet" and wrote, "In the moving figure of The Bride, Khan has delivered her defining statement as an artist." Nina Keen of DIY noted that "[t]here's a resistance [to] clichés on this record, and Khan gives a freshness and a sincerity to her otherwise ethereal music", calling the album "a beautiful, complex and often harrowing listening experience."

Pitchforks Cameron Cook stated the album "may be Bat for Lashes' most ambitious project yet" and commented, "Its few shortcomings aside, The Bride is further proof that Khan, unlike almost all of her contemporaries, understands how to wade into mystical realms and emerge with big, beguiling pop." Kory Grow of Rolling Stone felt that although "the album lags when the story gets too heavy", "there are many songs on The Bride that transcend its thematic conceit and stand on their own as unique puzzle pieces in Kahn's steadfastly mystifying persona." Heather Phares of AllMusic stated that the album "begins vividly", but was unimpressed with its "slower" second half, concluding that "The Bride is beautifully crafted, but not always thrilling." Katie Rife of The A.V. Club expressed that following "Never Forgive the Angels", "the power of The Brides narrative begins to fade in a series of piano-focused ballads that, while uniformly beautiful [...] aren't distinctive enough songwriting-wise to stand out from one another." Slant Magazines Sal Cinquemani wrote, "That The Bride works best as a song cycle rather than a collection of pop hooks is a testament to its cohesion and intrinsic intertexuality, but what's missing here is Khan's knack for grafting avant-art-rock concepts onto mainstream forms."

Accolades

Commercial performance
The Bride debuted at number nine on the UK Albums Chart with 8,242 copies sold in its first week, becoming Khan's third consecutive top-10 album.

Track listing

Personnel
Credits adapted from the liner notes of The Bride.

Musicians

 Natasha Khan – Omnichord ; vocals ; drum programming ; Rhodes, electric guitar, tambourine ; keys, mandolin, pocket piano ; synths ; drums ; harp ; Farfisa organ ; guitar ; string arrangements ; celesta, vibraphone ; piano, bass synth ; drum machine ; claps 
 Ben Christophers – bowed guitar ; bass ; vocals, piano 
 David Baron – bass ; synths ; Rhodes ; programming ; string arrangements 
 Jacknife Lee – synths, programming, sampler 
 Alex Reeves – timpani ; drums, percussion 
 Simone Felice – drums 
 Rachael Yamagata – backing vocals 
 Sandy Bell – backing vocals 
 Lou Rogai – guitars ; bass ; backing vocals 
 Dan Carey – programming, synths 
 Leo Taylor – drums 
 Dawn Landes – guitar, backing vocals 
 Kevin Salem – guitar 
 Davide Rossi – strings ; string arrangements 
 Matt Hales – drum programming, synths

Technical

 Natasha Khan – production 
 Simone Felice – co-production ; recording 
 David Baron – co-production, mixing ; recording ; sound effects 
 Head – co-production, mixing ; recording 
 Ben Christophers – co-production ; recording ; sound effects 
 Jacknife Lee – co-production, recording 
 Dan Carey – co-production, recording 
 Matt Hales – co-production, recording 
 Pete Hanlon – engineering ; recording 
 Tony Cousins – mastering 
 Davide Rossi – string recording

Artwork
 Natasha Khan – art direction, concept
 Neil Krug – photography
 Michael Whitham – commissioning
 Richard Welland – design

Charts

References

2016 albums
Albums produced by Dan Carey (record producer)
Bat for Lashes albums
Concept albums
Parlophone albums
Warner Records albums